Johann Nikolaus Stupanus (born Johann Nikolaus Stuppa; 1542–1621) was an Italian-Swiss physician, known also as a translator. He was the father of Emmanuel Stupanus (1587–1664).

Life
He was originally from Pontresina, and joined the faculty of medicine at the University of Basel. He taught theoretical medicine there from 1589 to 1620 and developed a systematic medical semiology.

Work
Stupanus wrote an introduction to the second edition (1581) of The Prince by Niccolò Machiavelli: it was a Latin translation by Silvestro Tegli and published at Basel by Pietro Perna, both Italian Protestants in exile and followers of Caelius Secundus Curio (whose panegyric oration Stupanus had given at Basel in 1570). Stupanus committed a provocation by dedicating the work to the Catholic bishop Jakob Christoph Blarer von Wartensee, and for a time was deprived of his teaching post. In 1588 a Latin translation of Machiavelli's Discourses on Livy by Stupanus himself was published.

Notes

External links
WorldCat page, alternate WorldCat page

1542 births
1621 deaths
16th-century Swiss physicians
Swiss translators
Swiss-Italian people